Melanoma-associated leukoderma is a cutaneous condition, and is a vitiligo-like depigmentation that can occur in patients with cutaneous or ocular melanoma.

See also 
 Pallister–Killian syndrome
 List of cutaneous conditions

References 

Disturbances of human pigmentation